This is a list of the members of the Australian House of Representatives in the First Australian Parliament, which was elected on 29 and 30 March 1901. There were 75 members, as required by the Constitution, as near as possible to twice the number of Senators which was then 36. South Australia and Tasmania had not been divided into electoral divisions in 1901 which resulted in the particular state voting as a single electorate. There were seven members for South Australia, and five members for Tasmania elected.

King O'Malley, who died in 1953, was the last surviving member of the 1901-1903 House of Representatives. Henry Willis was the last surviving Free Trade member, and Richard Crouch was the last surviving Protectionist member.

Members

Notes

Members of Australian parliaments by term
20th-century Australian politicians